The Kings' Cup was a rivalry between Lou City and Saint Louis FC, members of the USL Championship. Both teams joined the second-tier league (then known as the United Soccer League) in 2015. Like the cities of both clubs, the rivalry takes its name from King Louis of France, (though not the same one – Louisville is named after Louis XVI while St. Louis after Louis IX,) which also explains the presence of the fleur-de-lis in both city flags and both teams' crests. While both teams are currently members of the USLC Eastern Conference, Saint Louis has often been a member of the USLC Western Conference instead, due to its presence near the very center of the country.

The rivalry officially began in both clubs' inaugural match as STLFC traveled to Louisville for their opening match in the 2015 USL season. LouCity won the match 2–0, setting the tone for the rivalry, with STLFC only winning twice as of July 18th, 2020, and only earning one USL Playoffs appearance against LouCity's two USL titles. Their second match a month and a half later in St. Louis cemented the rivalry status with a 3–3 shootout that included eight yellow cards.

Due to financial challenges stemming from the COVID-19 pandemic and the upcoming creation of St. Louis City SC in Major League Soccer, STLFC folded after the 2020 season. Their final game was the only Kings' Cup playoff match, won by LouCity by the same 2–0 scoreline as the very first match in Louisville.

A renewal of the rivalry has occurred, starting in 2022 when St Louis City SC's reserve team began play with the Division 3 league MLS Next Pro. The two clubs faced off in a pre-season match on March 5, 2022 in St. Louis as well as in the third round of the 2023 U.S. Open Cup. Future preseason or U.S. Open Cup matches between St Louis City SC and Louisville City FC are expected.

All-time results

Overall statistics 
There have been a total of 16 competitive games (including 1 playoff match not counted toward the Kings' Cup points system) and 1 friendly between Louisville City FC and Saint Louis FC. LouCity has won 9 competitive matches (including the playoff victory) and drawn 5, with 2 wins for STLFC.

The largest victory in the series was a 5–1 victory for LouCity at STLFC's World Wide Technology Soccer Park. This also tied for the highest-scoring game in the series with a 3–3 draw also in St. Louis. STLFC's two victories have both been by one goal.

Winners by season 
The team with the most points from regular season matches between the two wins the Cup. Goal difference will serve as the first tiebreaker if the teams are tied on points, and away goals will be the second tiebreaker. If the teams are still tied after that, then the holder from the prior season keeps the Cup.

* 2018 Kings' Cup decided as the winner of the USOC match

Honors

Player records

Goal scorers 
. Does not include own goals.

Supporters 

The supporters' groups for both clubs predate their respective clubs by over a year. The Coopers of Louisville helped convince Orlando City owners that Louisville would be a worthy landing spot for Orlando's USL franchise when the main Orlando team moved to MLS. The Louligans of St. Louis formed to support AC St. Louis and have supported a large number of professional and amateur St. Louis-area soccer teams. The two SGs decided to form the "rivalry" as their inaugural season in USL began as a way to make things fun between expansion partners that happened to be in relatively close geographic proximity, granting the rivalry a "frenemy" status. The two SGs have worked together to raise money for charity as well.

References 

Louisville City FC
Saint Louis FC
Soccer rivalries in the United States
Soccer cup competitions in the United States